

Frankton is a village and civil parish in the Rugby borough of Warwickshire in England.  In the 2001 Census it had a population of 344, increasing to 351 at the 2011 Census.

Etymology
According to W. H. Duignan, the town's earliest name, Franchtone, was derived from the Anglo-Saxon Franca or Franco (the personal name of the original settler, which is probably derived from the national name of the Franks) and -tun, making it either "Franca's town" or "the town of the Franks".

Location and history

Frankton is located about six miles south-west of Rugby, adjacent to the B4453 road linking Rugby and Princethorpe.  The village stands on a hill approximately 360 feet above sea level.  There are houses ranging from the 18th century to modern buildings, and a public house. Saint Nicholas church lies at the western end of the village, the earliest parts of which date from the 13th century. It is a Grade II* listed building.

References

External links

Villages in Warwickshire
Civil parishes in Warwickshire